Vincent Di Bartoloméo (born 2 July 1981 in Montluçon) is a French football coach, currently for US Créteil B, and former professional player.

He played on the professional level in Ligue 2 for LB Châteauroux.  Di Bartolomeo is the current record appearance holder for Creteil after overtaking the record number of games set by Boris Mahon de Monaghan.

References

External links
 
 
 

Living people
1981 births
People from Montluçon
Sportspeople from Allier
Association football defenders
French footballers
Ligue 2 players
LB Châteauroux players
FC Sète 34 players
US Créteil-Lusitanos players
AS Cannes players
Pau FC players
Footballers from Auvergne-Rhône-Alpes